Lance Strulovitch (born 29 October 1998), better known as Lance Stroll, is a Canadian–Belgian racing driver competing under the Canadian flag in Formula One. He has driven for Aston Martin since , having previously driven for Williams and Racing Point. He was Italian F4 champion in 2014, Toyota Racing Series champion in 2015, and 2016 FIA European Formula 3 champion. He was part of the Ferrari Driver Academy from 2010 to 2015. He achieved his first podium finish, a 3rd place, at the 2017 Azerbaijan Grand Prix, becoming the second-youngest driver to finish an F1 race on the podium and the youngest (and latest as of the end of 2021) to do so during his rookie season. At the 2020 Turkish Grand Prix, Stroll took his first pole position in Formula One. Stroll also competed in endurance racing, taking part in the 24 Hours of Daytona in 2016 and 2018.

Personal life 
Stroll is the son of Canadian businessman Lawrence Stroll (part-owner of the Aston Martin Formula One team) and Belgian fashion designer Claire-Anne Callens, and has an older sister named Chloe. His parents are divorced and his father has since remarried to Raquel Diniz. He is of Russian Jewish descent from his father's side. Stroll races under the Canadian flag and holds both Canadian and Belgian citizenship. He is bilingual speaking both English and French.

Career 
Like many race drivers, the Geneva-based Canadian began his motorsport career in karting at the age of 10. He recorded numerous race and championship wins in his native Canada and North America and in 2008, his first year of karting, he won the Federation de Sport Automobile du Quebec rookie of the year award and driver of the year in 2009. In 2010, Stroll became a member of the Ferrari Driver Academy.

Formula 4 
Stroll's car racing debut came in the 2014 Florida Winter Series, a non-championship series organized by the Ferrari Driver Academy. He raced against future Formula One competitors Nicholas Latifi and Max Verstappen, and took two podium finishes as well as pole position at Homestead–Miami Speedway.

Stroll made his competitive car racing debut in the 2014 Italian F4 Championship, driving for Prema Powerteam. Despite missing the final round due to injury, Stroll emerged as series champion, taking seven race wins, thirteen podium finishes, and five pole positions.

Formula 3

2015 
At the beginning of 2015, Stroll won the New Zealand-based Toyota Racing series, recording 10 podiums – including four wins – from 16 race starts. In the same year, he also contested the FIA Formula 3 European Championship with Prema Powerteam, in which his father by this time had taken a stake. He competed against future Formula One competitors Antonio Giovinazzi, Charles Leclerc, George Russell and Alexander Albon, winning one race at the Hockenheimring and achieving six total podium finishes in the 33-race series. He ended the season 5th in the championship. 2015 also marked Stroll's first and only appearance at the non-championship Formula Three Macau Grand Prix, in which he finished in 8th place.

On 11 November 2015, it was announced that Stroll would leave the Ferrari Driver Academy to serve as a test driver for Williams.

2016 
Stroll began 2016 by finishing 5th at the 2016 24 Hours of Daytona, driving for Ford Chip Ganassi Racing in a Ford EcoBoost Prototype. He remained with Prema Powerteam for a third consecutive year to compete in his second season of the Formula 3 European Championship. He won the first race at Circuit Paul Ricard before taking thirteen more race victories over the season, including five consecutive victories in the final five races. He claimed the title with four races to go and ended the season 187 points clear of nearest competitor Maximilian Günther.

Throughout the season, Stroll and his team were accused of manufacturing his title via team orders to his teammates, which was highlighted by George Russell, who stated at Le Castellet, where Stroll had inherited the lead from a slowing Nick Cassidy, who ended up finishing second, that "it's not a fair fight".

Formula One

Williams (2017–2018)

2017 

Stroll drove for the Williams team for the 2017 Formula One season, partnering Felipe Massa. He became the first Canadian Formula One driver since the  World Drivers' Champion Jacques Villeneuve. Reportedly, Stroll's father Lawrence paid $80 million to Williams prior to his Formula One debut.

He retired from the race with a brake failure. Stroll scored his first Formula One points at his home Grand Prix in Montreal, finishing in ninth place.

He finished third to become the youngest rookie and the second-youngest driver after Max Verstappen to finish on the podium in Formula One, at the age of 18 years and 239 days.

Due to Red Bull drivers Daniel Ricciardo and Max Verstappen (respectively third and second) taking grid penalties, Stroll was promoted to second place on the starting grid, making him the youngest Formula One driver to start on the front row at the age of 18 years and 310 days. Stroll finished seventh in the race. He recorded two eighth-place finishes at the Singapore (where he started eighteenth) and Malaysian Grands Prix. At the latter, Stroll and Sebastian Vettel collided on the cool-down lap after the end of the race. Both drivers blamed the other for the incident, however no action was taken by the stewards.

This result placed him ahead of teammate Felipe Massa in the Drivers' Championship for the first time that season. Stroll ended the season twelfth in the Drivers' Championship, scoring 40 of the team's 83 points. Furthermore, Stroll gained more positions on the opening lap than any other driver that year.

2018 

For the 2018 season, Stroll remained with Williams, partnered by Sergey Sirotkin after Massa retired from Formula One. The Williams FW41 was the slowest car of the field and the team finished last in the constructors' championship that season. He then retired from the following  with a tire puncture. He went on to finish ninth in the race with teammate Sirotkin in tenth, marking Williams' only double points-finish that season.

Stroll finished eighteenth in the Drivers' Championship, scoring six of the team's seven points. Sirotkin out-qualified Stroll at twelve of the twenty-one races.

Racing Point (2019–2020)

2019 

Stroll switched to driving for the newly renamed Racing Point team for the  season after the team was bought by a consortium of investors led by his father Lawrence. He replaced Esteban Ocon at the team and raced alongside Sergio Pérez. Stroll scored his first points for his new team at the season-opening , finishing ninth. At the  he was involved in a collision with Lando Norris that ended both drivers' races. He finished ninth at the  having started seventeenth.

He switched to slick tires late in the race as the track was drying, elevating him to second place. He missed out on a podium after being overtaken by Daniil Kvyat and Sebastian Vettel.

Stroll ended his first season at Racing Point fifteenth in the Drivers' Championship with 21 points, below teammate Pérez's tally of 52 points. He was out-qualified by Pérez at eighteen of the season's twenty-one races.

2020 

As a result of Canada's national sporting authority resigning its mandate from the FIA, Stroll raced under an American licence but was still recognised as Canadian on race weekends. He finished seventh having overtaken Daniel Ricciardo in a move Ricciardo described as "desperate" and deserving of a penalty. He was in second place when the race restarted after a red flag period before being passed by multiple cars including Pierre Gasly. Stroll later suggested that his poor restart cost him the chance to win the race after Gasly claimed victory. After eight races, Stroll was in fourth place in the Drivers' Championship.

He then withdrew from the  prior to qualifying due to illness, having sat out the third practice session. His team confirmed he did not have COVID-19, saying he had passed all necessary FIA tests in this regard. He was replaced at the event by Nico Hülkenberg. Shortly after the race, Stroll tested positive for COVID-19. This caused Stroll's eventual retirement from the race, his fourth consecutive non-finish.

Stroll took his first pole position at the  after a wet qualifying session. In doing so, he became the first Canadian F1 driver to take pole position since Jacques Villeneuve at the 1997 European Grand Prix. Stroll led the race for 32 of the 58 laps, but reported severe tire graining and eventually fell to ninth place by the end of the race. After the race, Racing Point found damage on Stroll's front wing which they named as the cause of his tire issues. Stroll was uninjured and was able to extract himself from the car.

At the end of the season, Stroll stood eleventh in the Drivers' Championship, scoring 75 of the team's 210 points.

Aston Martin

2021 

He was partnered by Sebastian Vettel in place of Pérez. Stroll qualified and finished tenth in the season-opening . A video of him driving over a curb at the  became a popular internet meme, used as a bait-and-switch similar to rickrolling, after the official broadcast interrupted a battle between Vettel, Pierre Gasly and Lewis Hamilton to show a replay of Stroll driving over the curbs. A high-speed tire failure at the  ended Stroll's race. A similar incident then happened to Max Verstappen later in the race, prompting tire manufacturer Pirelli to conduct an investigation into the failures.

Stroll caused a collision on the first lap of the  that eliminated himself and Charles Leclerc from the race and caused Daniel Ricciardo significant damage. Stroll ended the season thirteenth in the Drivers' Championship, scoring 34 points to Vettel's 43.

2022 

Aston Martin retained Stroll and Vettel for the  season. He failed to set a qualifying time at the  due to a crash with Nicholas Latifi for which Stroll was penalised. He made three pit stops during the race and later received a penalty for weaving on the straight when defending against Valtteri Bottas, finishing twelfth. Stroll took his first points of the year with tenth at the Emilia Romagna Grand Prix, and followed it up with another tenth place finish in Miami, despite a collision with Kevin Magnussen.

More tenth-place finishes came at the Canadian, French and Dutch Grands Prix. He ran as high as third in the opening laps but was eliminated in a high-speed collision with Fernando Alonso. A penalty for dangerous defending against teammate Vettel in the  sprint dropped Stroll to fifteenth on the grid for the race, in which he recovered to score a point in tenth place. Stroll ended the season fifteenth in the Drivers' Championship with 18 points to Vettel's 37.

2023 
The Canadian missed all three days of pre-season testing at Bahrain International Circuit after suffering a cycling accident while training, being replaced by reserve driver Felipe Drugovich. Stroll sustained multiple injuries in the accident; a fracture and displacement in his right wrist, fracture in his left wrist and left hand, as well as a broken toe. Minor surgery was performed on his right wrist with metal screws being inserted. He returned for the free practice sessions and the race. In the second free practice session, he reported lingering pain from his wrists that forced him to adopt a relaxed style of driving; he said that while he felt "rather stiff", he "felt alright" in the car. Stroll qualified eighth for the race and finished sixth despite a first-lap collision between him and his teammate.

Karting record

Karting career summary

Racing record

Racing career summary 

 Season still in progress.

Open–wheel racing results

Complete Italian F4 Championship results 
(key) (Races in bold indicate pole position) (Races in italics indicate fastest lap)

Complete Toyota Racing Series results 
(key) (Races in bold indicate pole position) (Races in italics indicate fastest lap)

Complete FIA Formula 3 European Championship results
(key) (Races in bold indicate pole position) (Races in italics indicate fastest lap)

Complete Macau Grand Prix results

Complete Formula One results
(key) (Races in bold indicate pole position; races in italics indicate fastest lap)

 Did not finish, but was classified as he had completed more than 90% of the race distance.
 Season still in progress.

Sports car racing results

Complete IMSA SportsCar Championship results
(key) (Races in bold indicate pole position) (Races in italics indicate fastest lap)

24 Hours of Daytona results

See also
 Formula One drivers from Canada
 List of Formula One polesitters
List of select Jewish racing drivers

Notes

References

 Biography at motorsport.com

External links

 
 

1998 births
Living people
Racing drivers from Quebec
Sportspeople from Montreal
Karting World Championship drivers
Italian F4 Championship drivers
Italian F4 champions
Toyota Racing Series drivers
Canadian people of Belgian descent
Canadian people of Jewish descent
Jewish Canadian sportspeople
Jewish sportspeople
FIA Formula 3 European Championship drivers
WeatherTech SportsCar Championship drivers
Internet memes introduced in 2021
Internet memes
24 Hours of Daytona drivers
Canadian Formula One drivers
Williams Formula One drivers
Racing Point Formula One drivers
Aston Martin Formula One drivers
Prema Powerteam drivers
M2 Competition drivers
Chip Ganassi Racing drivers
Jota Sport drivers
Canadian people of Serbian descent